Barbara Stephens (born November 1, 1939 as Boysa Stephens in Atlanta, Georgia) is an American singer.

Stephens spent most of her career as a solo artist with Satellite Records (later Stax Records), recording several hit songs such as "The Life I Live" and "Wait A Minute". She also sang with two bands, the Gardenias and the Deltones.

She stopped recording and touring in 1971 in order to marry and raise children. She currently resides in Atlanta.

External links 
 http://staxrecords.free.fr/stephens.htm

1939 births
Musicians from Atlanta
Living people
American women singers
21st-century American women